Symphyochlamys erlangeri is a species of plant in the family Malvaceae. It is endemic to Somalia. It is the sole species in the genus Symphyochlamys.

References

Hibisceae
Near threatened plants
Endemic flora of Somalia
Malvaceae genera
Monotypic Malvales genera
Taxonomy articles created by Polbot
Taxobox binomials not recognized by IUCN